Poppy Cat (alternatively The Extraordinary Adventures of Poppy Cat) is a British preschool animated television series, which first aired on 2 May 2011 and last aired on 5 February 2016. It is based on a series of books created by British illustrator and writer Lara Jones, and is a co-production of Coolabi Productions, King Rollo Films, Ingenious Media, and Cake Entertainment for Nick Jr. and Channel 5.

Premise
The series centers on Poppy, a young neckerchief-wearing kitten heroine, leading her eccentric team of friends who are stuffed animals, Alma the bunny kit, Zuzu the Dalmatian puppy, an owl named Owl and Mo the mouse that belong to a little girl named Lara. Like all people, they walk upright, talk and go on many extraordinary adventures to faraway lands of wonder by any kind of transportation they need that matches her neckerchief, like a sailing ship, a train, an airplane, a hot-air balloon, a submarine, a rocket ship, a campervan, a horse and carriage and their very own car. But they have to stay away from Egbert, a European badger who is rude and makes fun of them.

Characters

Main
Lara is the narrator of the show. She is a six-year-old girl with an active imagination who writes and reads stories and draws pictures about the adventures of her pet kitten Poppy, the beloved young kitten leader and her eccentric team of friends, Alma the rabbit, Zuzu the puppy, Owl and Mo the mouse, and not the villain, Egbert the badger. Voiced in the UK by Maddie Page in the first season, Alisha Holmes in the second season, and in the US by Cindy Robinson.
Poppy Cat is the main protagonist in the series. She is the leader of the group. She is a feisty, imaginative, cheerful and happy-go-lucky young orange ginger tabby kitten with a big white face and long whiskers and she wears a magic multi-colored neckerchief that takes her and her stuffed animal friends on extraordinary adventures by any type of vehicle they need that matches her neckerchief pattern. She's an adventurer, a heroine, an imagineer, a dreamer, and a devoted best friend to her stuffed animal friends. Poppy's heroic gusto and unquenchable curiosity propel each adventure for her and her friends, often leading to unexpected experiences and discoveries. She is highly conscious of those around her and will go to the ends of the Earth to solve a problem. Poppy likes adventure, but her top priority is always her friends, which is why she is the unspoken leader of her little gang. She's the glue that holds them all together. On her birthday adventure, she wears a pink hat and serves as the Birthday Captain. Her catchphrases are "Would you like to come along?", "Would you like to play?", "Hoop-dee-doo!", "Hooray!", "That's a great idea!", "Come on, everybody!", "Okey-doke, we're off!" and "But first, we're going to need...(type of vehicles)!" Voiced in the UK by Joanna Page in the first season, Jessica Ransom in the second season, and in the US by Haley "Cake" Charles.
Zuzu is a speedy young black and white plush toy Dalmatian puppy with black spots. He is Poppy's best friend who loves doing tricks on his skateboard and laughs really loud. Zuzu is an adrenaline junkie who is competitive, loud, and practically fearless. He is impulsive and cool, quick to laugh at a joke, impatient when it comes to manners and protocol, and a good sport most of the time. Voiced in the UK by Joanna Ruiz and in the US by Katie Leigh.
Alma is a giggly young pink and white plush toy European rabbit kit with a big pink tummy, pink circles on her cheeks and in the US dub speaks in a Western accent. She often arrives at Poppy's breathless and worked up about a situation, though in the face of danger, she can be quite blithe, to Mo's chagrin. Alma, who fancies herself quite a singer, often coaxes her best buddy Mo to sing a duet. Mo has an unspoken little crush on Alma and worries about her a bit. The chatty rabbit is a loyal, affectionate friend who likes jewelry, the color pink, and picnics. She treasures a special seashell that Mo gave her to hear the ocean. In the mystery-solving adventures, she wears glasses with white fluffy eyebrows and red nose and a black pointy beard. Her catchphrases are "Oh, Poppy!", "Hoop-dee-doo!" and "Hooray!" She is implied to have numerous brothers and sisters, with the younger one being named Chester. Voiced in the UK by Nicola Hornett and in the US by Alicyn Packard.
Mo is a feisty young pink stuffed toy mouse with a yellow head, pink ears and a striped tail. He loves singing songs with Alma and eating cheese sandwiches, wears a red and green striped tanktop and is Alma's best friend who never gets squashed. In the mystery-solving adventures, he wears a black moustache. He is the youngest of the group. He is voiced in the UK by Charlie Cameron and in the US by Stephanie Darcy.
Owl is a lazy brown stuffed toy Eurasian eagle owl who wears a turquoise and purple striped wool hat with a purple pompom on top. He considers himself an expert on almost everything, knowledge that he has gleaned from books or his travels. Though he has traveled far from his comfortable house, Owl's directions are usually comically convoluted. Owl may complain about Zuzu's inadvertent path of destruction, but he has a soft spot for each of his friends. He's especially supportive of the timid Mo, and like everyone, has great respect for Poppy Cat. Owl likes the finer things in life: a soft coconut-leaf nest, a cup of hot chocolate, and a quick nap whenever he can catch one. He also likes to perform. He is the oldest of the group. Voiced in the UK by Chris Neill and in the US by Donald King.
In the episode "Royal Toad", his singing voice is provided by Spanish tenor opera legend Plácido Domingo.
Egbert is the main antagonist of the series. He is an arrogant, stout, sneaky, greedy, grumpy and adenoidal stuffed toy European badger and the master of disguise with an English accent in both the UK and US. He is desperate to be part of the group, although only by his rules. But rather than accept their invitation to play (or go on an adventure), Egbert always has 'top secret stuff' to go to on his way, only to always meet the group again, in their adventure. There, he will insert himself into their journey, costumed as a ridiculous antagonist of his own invention. Depending upon their location, Egbert may fancy himself to be a pirate, troll, or sea monster. His nerdy, eccentric energy elicits groans from everyone but Poppy. Egbert pretends to not know 'this Egbert', and always stays in character. He hates their friends' fun. Voiced in the UK and US by Teresa Gallagher.

Supporting
Gilda is an arrogant pigeon with an English accent in both the UK and the US. Voiced in the UK and US also by Teresa Gallagher.
Rocket Cat is Poppy Cat's favorite superhero. He appears in numerous episodes each time who Poppy Cat and her friends visits outer space. Voiced by in the UK by Richard Jones and in the US by Danny Katiana.
The Bumblebirds is a family of yellow long-necked birds who live in a big purple nest in the snowy mountains or in the sky. The near-sighted mother Bumblebird is voiced in the UK by Teresa Gallagher and in the US by Lara Jill Miller.

Minor
Ravi is Poppy's pen pal from Tiger Island. He is a young and friendly plush toy tiger cub who has a broken arm and can't play with the other tigers, only Poppy and her friends would play with him. Voiced in the UK by Teresa Gallagher and in the US by Kodi Smit-McPhee.
Chester is Alma's younger cousin who is four years old. He is a little white and blue plush toy rabbit with a big blue tummy and a Western accent who occasionally goes on adventures with his older cousin Alma and the rest of the crew. Voiced in the UK by Teresa Gallagher and in the US by Nancy Cartwright.

Episodes

Series 1 (2011)

Series 2 (2015–16)

Broadcast
Poppy Cat has aired in over 140 territories, including Sprout and NBC Kids in the United States, Disney Junior in Latin America, Spain, as La gatita Poppy and La Gata Lupe, KiKA in Germany, as Poppy Katz, Poland on MiniMini+, as Kotka Pusia, Baraem, Children's Channel and e-vision in U.A.E, SVT in Sweden, S4C's children's block Cyw in Wales, as Popi'r Gath EBS in Korea, Kids Station in Japan, Okto in Singapore, Nickelodeon in Australia, TVOKids and Knowledge Network in Canada, NRK in Norway, RTÉjr in Ireland, Mini CITV, Channel 5, ITVBe and Nick Jr. in the United Kingdom and Gulli in France. Poppy Cat first launched on KiKA in Germany in May 2015, with the second series released in April 2017.

Poppy Cat aired by accident on NBC affiliate WSMV-TV in Nashville on October 26, 2014 instead of the Manchester United-Chelsea Premier League match, sparking complaints on Twitter. WSMV-TV rejoined the game in the process.

References

External links
 

2011 British television series debuts
2016 British television series endings
2010s British children's television series
2010s British animated television series
British children's animated adventure television series
British flash animated television series
Channel 5 (British TV channel) original programming
Nick Jr. original programming
English-language television shows
Animated television series about cats
Animated television series about children
British television shows based on children's books
British preschool education television series
Animated preschool education television series
2010s preschool education television series